Lê Hồng Minh (born September 15, 1978) is a former Vietnamese footballer. He was a member of the Vietnam national football team.

Career
Lê Hồng Minh began playing football with local side Thanh Hóa FC, debuting in the first division at age 17. Soon, he began playing for Vietnam's Olympic football team, and was made captain of his club.

International Goals

References

External links 
Player profile - doha-2006.com

1978 births
Living people
Vietnamese footballers
Association football midfielders
Footballers at the 2002 Asian Games
Footballers at the 2006 Asian Games
Asian Games competitors for Vietnam
Vietnam international footballers
Thanh Hóa FC players
SHB Da Nang FC players
Hanoi FC players
V.League 1 players